Briggs Run flows into the Mohawk River near Yosts, New York.

References 

Rivers of Montgomery County, New York
Mohawk River
Rivers of New York (state)